Tannery is an unincorporated community in Hardy County, West Virginia, United States. Tannery is located south of Moorefield on the South Fork South Branch Potomac River.

References

Unincorporated communities in Hardy County, West Virginia
Unincorporated communities in West Virginia